Jed Danyel Kurzel (born 1976) is an Australian singer-songwriter-guitarist and film composer. He is a founding member of The Mess Hall (from 2001), a blues rock duo. His older brother Justin Kurzel is a film director and screenwriter.

Life and career 

Kurzel was born in 1976 and, with his older brother Justin Kurzel (born 1974), grew up in Gawler, South Australia. Their father, Zdzislaw Kurzel (1946–2006), was from Poland and had migrated to Australia in 1960, where he became a taxi driver. In the 1990s, Kurzel moved to Sydney, where Justin was studying at the National Institute of Dramatic Art (NIDA).

In 2001 Kurzel on lead vocals and guitar, Anthony Johnsen on drums and a bass guitarist formed a blues-rock group, the Mess Hall in Sydney – the bass guitarist soon left but was not replaced, they continued as a duo. Kurzel recalled "When the clubs asked us where our bass player was, we used to lie and say he was sick." Their debut album The Mess Hall was released in June 2003. In early 2004 Johnsen was replaced by Cec Condon on drums and vocals. Their third album Devils Elbow (October 2007) won the Australian Music Prize.

In 2000 Kurzel composed the film score for the short subject, Sammy Blue, at the Australian Film, Television and Radio School, with Kim Farrant directing. He worked for Farrant again: providing the score for Naked on the Inside (2006), a feature film documentary on body image. In 2009 he composed music for Castor & Pollux, a short film, directed by Ben Briand.

In 2011 Kurzel provided the music score for the directorial debut feature film by Justin, Snowtown. At the APRA-AGSC Screen Music Awards of 2011 Kurzel won Feature Film Score of the Year. It was nominated for Australian Film Institute Award for Best Original Music Score. The related soundtrack album was nominated for ARIA Award for Best Original Soundtrack, Cast or Show Album in that same year.

Kurzel also wrote the scores for Son of a Gun, Slow West and the documentary All This Mayhem. In 2015, he worked again with his brother on Macbeth, followed by Assassin's Creed in 2016. He replaced Harry Gregson-Williams as the composer of Alien: Covenant.

Filmography

Film

Documentaries

Shorts

Awards and nominations

ARIA Music Awards
The ARIA Music Awards is an annual awards ceremony that recognises excellence, innovation, and achievement across all genres of Australian music. They commenced in 1987. 

! 
|-
| 2011
| Snowtown
|  Best Original Soundtrack, Cast or Show Album
| 
|  
|}

External links

References 

1976 births
APRA Award winners
Australian film score composers
Australian rock musicians
Australian people of Polish descent
Australian people of Maltese descent
Living people
Male film score composers
Musicians from South Australia
People from Gawler, South Australia